Colegio Guadalupe may refer to:

Colegio Guadalupe (Argentina), a school run by the Society of the Divine Word
Colegio Guadalupe (Mexico City)
Colegio Nuestra Señora de Guadalupe, a high school in San Juan, Puerto Rico
Colegio Nuestra Señora de Guadalupe, a school in Venezuela